Indonesian Premier League (IPL; Indonesian: Liga Prima Indonesia) was the highest level competition for football clubs in Indonesia from 2011 to 2013. This competition was managed by PT Liga Prima Indonesia Sportindo, under supervision of the Football Association of Indonesia (PSSI). IPL replaced Indonesia Super League (ISL) as the highest-level football league in Indonesia.

History
Following the disbandment of the Liga Primer Indonesia in August 2011, along with the turn of the management of PSSI after a series of chaos over the implementation of the national football competition, a management under the leadership of then-new PSSI chairman Djohar Arifin Husin planned to make various changes intended to create a new competition.

Founding
On 26 August 2011, a member of Executive Committee and Chairman of the Competition Committee of PSSI, Sihar Sitorus, announced that the organization has appointed PT Liga Prima Indonesia Sportindo as manager of professional competition for the 2011–12 season, after the previous promoter, PT Liga Indonesia (PT LI), failed to provide an accountability report to the PSSI, while the verification to be performed by the AFC was imminent. Widjajanto, a former CEO of PT Liga Primer Indonesia, was appointed as the CEO of PT LPIS.

Shutdown
On 17 March 2013, a PSSI Extraordinary Congress announced an unified league, called the Indonesia Super League to be competed by 22 clubs. The Indonesian Premier League disbanded at the end of the 2013 season following its play-offs; IPL's seven best teams were required to pass a verification process to participate in the 2014 season, of which four (Semen Padang, Persiba Bantul, Persijap, and PSM Makassar) were admitted to the successor league.

Sponsorship
 2011–2012: MNC Media

Broadcasting
 2011–2012: MNC Media
 2013: Kompas TV (PSM Makassar & Persebaya 1927 home match) & MNC Media (play-off)

Teams

Championship history

Top scorers

Best Players

References

External links
 Official website of Indonesian Premier League
 Official website of PT Liga Prima Indonesia Sportindo
 Official website of the Football Association of Indonesia (PSSI)
 RSSSF.com – Indonesia – List of (Semi-)Professional Champions

 
1
Indonesia
2011 establishments in Indonesia
Sports leagues established in 2011
2013 disestablishments in Indonesia